In the Name of Love is the first Thompson Twins album released in the United States. The album was released in 1982 by Arista Records and comprises eight of the eleven tracks from their second album, Set, plus two of the singles from their debut album, A Product of ... (Participation) (neither of these albums were released separately in the US at that time).

The album was released on the strength of the single "In The Name of Love", which topped the dance music chart in Billboard magazine, reaching the number one position and staying there for five weeks between 22 May and 19 June 1982.  The title track also peaked at number sixty-nine on the soul chart.
The song was also featured two years later on the soundtrack for the movie Ghostbusters. The single was remixed in 1988, resulting in another number one single on the dance charts, as well as reaching number forty-six on the UK singles chart.

Track listing
 "In the Name of Love" (s) 5:39 (extended)
 "Living in Europe" (s) 3:30
 "Bouncing" (s) 2:34
 "The Rowe" (s) 6:30
 "Make Believe" (p) 3:24 (single version with "Lama Sabach Tani" lyric)
 "Runaway" (s) 3:16 (remix)
 "Another Fantasy" (s) 4:00
 "Fool's Gold" (s) 3:22
 "Perfect Game" (p) 4:28
 "Good Gosh" (s) 3:08

s - From Set
p - From A Product of ... (Participation)

References

External links
 

1982 albums
Thompson Twins albums
Albums produced by Steve Lillywhite
Albums produced by Mike Howlett
Arista Records albums